The Copa Merconorte 2001 was an association football tournament in 2001 and the last Copa Merconorte to be held. Millonarios of Colombia defeated Emelec of Ecuador in the final.

Group stage
Each team played the other teams in the group twice during the group stage. The first place team advanced to the second round.

Group A

Group B

Group C

Group D

Semifinals
The semifinals consisted of two games between the Necaxa (winner of Group A) and Millonarios (winner of Group B), and two games between the Santos Laguna (winner of Group C) and Emelec (winner of Group D). Both series were decided in penalty kicks because the net of both games was a draw.

5-5 on aggregate, Millonarios won 3-1 on penalties

5-5 on aggregate, Emelec won 4-2 on penalties

Finals
After tying both matches, Millonarios defeated Emelec in penalty kicks.

Champion

External links

Copa Merconorte
3
Merco
Mer